The Reverend Jesse R. Zeigler Residence is a Frank Lloyd Wright house in Frankfort, Kentucky.

The Zeigler house is the only Frank Lloyd Wright structure built in Kentucky during the lifetime of the famous architect.  The design came from a chance meeting between Zeigler and Wright while both were traveling to Europe in late October 1909.  They struck up a conversation and the commission of this structure, completed the following year, was the result.  The structure is a typical example of Wright's "A Fireproof House for $5000".

The structure was placed on the National Register of Historic Places in 1976. The house is privately owned and is not available for tours.

Gallery

References

 Storrer, William Allin. The Frank Lloyd Wright Companion. University Of Chicago Press, 2006,  (S.164)

Houses completed in 1909
Houses in Frankfort, Kentucky
Houses on the National Register of Historic Places in Kentucky
National Register of Historic Places in Frankfort, Kentucky
Prairie School architecture in Kentucky
Frank Lloyd Wright buildings
1909 establishments in Kentucky